The Affordable Art Fair is an international, contemporary art fair held in different cities around the world. First launched in Battersea Park, London, England, in 1999, the Affordable Art Fair is now an international event taking place in several cities across the world including London, Amsterdam, Brussels, Hamburg, Stockholm, New York, Hong Kong, Singapore, Sydney and Melbourne.

The fairs take place annually with the exception of Battersea and New York, which hold spring and autumn editions and run across four days. Affordable Art Fairs showcase talks, programmes and artist-led workshops, and most also provide art-based activities for children.

Founded by Will Ramsay, the Affordable Art Fair was organised as an alternative to the traditional gallery scene. With its price ceiling of £7,500/€10,00/$12,000, the fair aims to appeal to and make art accessible for all. The fair announced nearly 200,000 visitors each year.

Employing nearly 70 people full-time, Affordable Art Fair have offices in every city in which they operate.

History
The first fair was launched in Battersea Park in London in October 1999. The Affordable Art Fair then launched a second event in Battersea Park to showcase different artists from the October event. In the same year, a fair was established in Bristol, taking place in September.

In 2002, the Affordable Art Fair launched a fair in New York. In 2007, the company began to expand within Europe, starting with the launch of a fair in Amsterdam. Affordable Art Fairs now take place around the world, with fairs in numerous cities spread across four continents. 2012 saw the Affordable Art Fair launch in five new cities and it launched in Hong Kong in 2013. In 2014, for the fourth year in a row, the Affordable Art Fair was voted a CoolBrand in the UK, nominated by the British public and the CoolBrand council.

Ramsay Fairs, owns the Affordable Art Fair, the Pulse Art Fair in Miami and VOLTA, an art fair in Switzerland (Basel) and the USA (New York and Miami).

In 2020, the in person fairs were cancelled and went online. The fairs returned as a live event in 2021.

Charitable work 

Affordable Art Fair have donated over £1 million to worthwhile causes since 1999. In 2016, the company unified its approach to charitable work by ensuring every fair worked with an Art Therapy charity. As well as donating money the events provide a platform in which charities can raise awareness of their activities, fundraise and connect with new supporters. They have worked with a number of charities including The Sovereign Art Foundation and North London Hospice.

References 

 Local media reports for:
 AAF Battersea 
 AAF Amsterdam 
 AAF Milan
 AAF Brussels 
 AAF Stockholm 
 AAF Hamburg 
 AAF NYC 
 AAF Hong Kong 
 AAF Singapore
 Production of Affordable Art.com

External links
 Company website
 Interview with founder referring to the charitable work

Recurring events established in 1999
1999 establishments in England
Annual events in London
Arts in London
Art fairs
Contemporary art exhibitions